The Oise-Aisne American Cemetery Plot E is the fifth plot at the Oise-Aisne American Cemetery and Memorial, an American military cemetery in northern France that comprises four main burial plots (i.e., A, B, C and D) containing the remains of 6,012 service personnel, all of whom died during World War I.

Plot E is approximately 100 meters away from the main cemetery and is a separate, hidden section which currently contains the remains of 94 American military prisoners, all of whom were executed by hanging or firing squad under military authority for crimes committed during or shortly after World War II. Their victims were 26 fellow American soldiers (all murdered) and 71 British, French, German, Italian, Polish and Algerian civilians (both male and female) who were raped or murdered.

In total, the US Army executed 98 servicemen following general courts martial for murder or rape in the European Theatre of Operations during the Second World War. The remains of these servicemen were originally buried near the site of their executions, which took place in countries as far apart as England, France, Belgium, Germany, Italy and Algeria. In 1949, the remains of these men were re-interred in Plot E, a private section specifically built to hold what the Graves Registration referred to as "the dishonored dead"; per standard practice, all had been dishonorably discharged from the US Army the day before their executions.

Plot E is detached from the main four cemetery plots for the honored dead of World War I. It is located across the road and deliberately hidden from view, inside a 100×50 feet oval-shaped clearing surrounded by hedges and hidden in thick forest. Officially, Plot E does not exist: it is not mentioned on the ABMC website or in any guide pamphlets or maps. The plot is accessible only through the back door of the superintendent's office. Access is difficult and visitors are not encouraged, though the section is maintained by cemetery caretakers who periodically mow the lawn area and trim the hedges. One cemetery employee described Plot E as a "house of shame" and a "perfect anti-memorial".

Unlike the marble monuments and inscribed standing headstones of the regular plots, Plot E contains nothing but 96 flat stone markers (arranged in four rows) and a single small granite cross. The white grave markers are the size of index cards and have nothing on them except sequential numbers engraved in black. The intention was that individual graves would be impossible to identify; however, the secrecy of each grave's occupant was undone by a Freedom of Information Act request in 2009.

No US flag is permitted to fly over the section, and the numbered graves literally lie with their backs turned to the main cemetery on the other side of the road.

The only individual buried in Plot E who had not been convicted of rape or murder was Eddie Slovik (formerly Row 3, Grave 65), who was executed for desertion on 31 January 1945. His wife, Antoinette Slovik, petitioned the Army for her husband's remains and his pension until her death in 1979. Slovik's case was taken up in 1981 by a former Macomb County, Michigan commissioner, Bernard V. Calka, a Polish-American World War II veteran, who continued to press the Army for the return of Slovik's remains. In 1987, he persuaded President Ronald Reagan to grant the petition request. In response, Calka raised $5,000 to pay for the exhumation and reinterment at Detroit's Woodmere Cemetery, where Slovik was reburied next to his wife.

African American murder victim Emmett Till's father, Louis Till, is among the interred convicts.

Burials at Plot E 
All individuals currently interred in Plot E were found guilty at general court martial of the capital crimes of rape, murder or both.

After being held from the public from the time of the creation of Plot E, the names and grave locations of the men buried there became available in 2009 following a Freedom of Information Act request. Prior to that release, the public could not determine who was buried in a particular grave, as the graves are only marked with numbers.

The following table provides names, serial numbers, locations, and associated grave numbers of deceased interred in Plot E of the Oise-Aisne American Cemetery.

Note: additional background information (e.g. place of enlistment and year of birth etc.) regarding the condemned men can be found by entering the relevant service number into Online World War II Indexes & Records.
 Private Eddie Slovik, 36896415, was buried in Row 3 Grave 65 until his remains were returned to the United States in 1987.
 Private Alex F. Miranda, 39297382, was buried in Row 2 Grave 27 until his remains were returned to the United States in 1990.

See also
 Capital punishment by the United States military
 Fort Leavenworth Military Prison Cemetery – American cemetery which  holds the remains of German WWII POWs
 Shepton Mallet (HM Prison) – provides details of the 18 American servicemen executed there who were later moved to Plot E

References

External links
 Wikimapia aerial view showing the boundaries of Plot E highlighted in red
 
 An aerial view of Plot E showing its location relative to the main cemetery
 Assorted photos of Plot E dating from 2020

20th-century criminals
World War II cemeteries in France
Capital punishment by the United States Military
United States Department of Defense lists